is a passenger railway station in the town of Meiwa, Gunma, Japan, operated by the private railway operator Tōbu Railway.

Lines

Station layout
This station has two opposed side platforms. Platform 1 is for stops in the direction of Tatebayashi and platform 2 is for stops in the direction of Asakusa. After passing through the wicket, a passenger will step onto platform one. Platform two can be reached by going up a set of stairs, through a short hallway and down another set of stairs. There is a toilet on the Tatebayashi platform.

Platforms

Adjacent stations

History

Kawamata Station first opened on 23 April 1903 at a location on the bank of the Tone River. The station re-opened at its current location on 27 August 1907.

From 17 March 2012, station numbering was introduced on all Tōbu lines, with Kawamata Station becoming "TI-08".

Passenger statistics
In fiscal 2019, the station was used by an average of 2895 passengers daily (boarding passengers only).

Surrounding area
 Meiwa town office
 Meiwa town library
 Meiwa town gymnasium
 Kawamata Post Office
 Umebara JA

See also
 List of railway stations in Japan

References

External links

 Kawamata Station information (Tobu) 

Tobu Isesaki Line
Stations of Tobu Railway
Railway stations in Gunma Prefecture
Railway stations in Japan opened in 1903
Meiwa, Gunma